The 1833 Connecticut gubernatorial election was held on April 1, 1833. Former senator and Democratic nominee Henry W. Edwards was elected, defeating incumbent governor and National Republican nominee John S. Peters with 41.31% of the vote.

Peters won a plurality of the vote, but did not win a majority. The state constitution required in that case, the Connecticut General Assembly would elect the governor. Edwards won the vote in the state legislature and was elected governor.

This was the last appearance of the National Republican Party in a Connecticut gubernatorial election.

General election

Candidates
Major party candidates

Henry W. Edwards, Democratic
John S. Peters, National Republican

Candidates
Minor party candidates

Zalmon Storrs, Anti-Masonic

Results

References

1833
Connecticut
Gubernatorial